Lewisville may refer to the following places:

Canada
Lewisville, New Brunswick, a former village, now part of the cities of Moncton and Dieppe

United States
Lewisville, Arkansas
Lewisville, Idaho
Lewisville, Indiana
Lewisville, Minnesota
Lewisville, New Jersey
Lewisville, North Carolina
Lewisville, Oregon
Lewisville, Texas
Lewisville, Virginia
Lewisville, Washington

See also
Lewisville High School
Louisville (disambiguation)
Lewis (disambiguation)